Jason K. Fettig (born 1974/1975) is a United States Marine Corps colonel who is the music adviser to the President of the United States and the 28th director of the United States Marine Band.

Originally from Manchester, New Hampshire, Fettig was educated at the University of Massachusetts Amherst and the University of Maryland. An accomplished clarinetist, he assumed command of the United States Marine Band in 2014 after several years serving as the band's assistant director. , he holds the rank of colonel.

Early life and education

Originally from Manchester, New Hampshire, Fettig began playing clarinet at age eight. He graduated from Manchester Central High School, where he was drum major of the Manchester Central High School Marching Band, and completed his undergraduate education at the University of Massachusetts Amherst, where he studied music education. Later, he received a master's degree in orchestral conducting from the University of Maryland, College Park.

Career

Early career
After completing his undergraduate studies, Fettig performed as a clarinetist with the American Wind Symphony Orchestra. He enlisted in the United States Marine Corps in 1997 and was posted to the U.S. Marine Band. In 2002 he was commissioned first lieutenant and appointed assistant director of the band. Two years later, in 2004, he was promoted to captain and the band's executive officer and, in 2007, was further promoted to major. During his tenure as assistant director, Fettig led expansion of the band's educational outreach programs, organizing clinics for music students in the District of Columbia Public Schools and creating an annual Young People's Concert.

Director of the United States Marine Band 

Fettig was promoted to lieutenant colonel, receiving the John Philip Sousa Baton and, with it, command of the United States Marine Band during a 2014 change of command ceremony officiated by Commandant of the Marine Corps General James F. Amos at Schlesinger Hall in Springfield, Virginia. He was advanced to colonel by order of President of the United States Donald Trump in an August 2017 promotion ceremony held in the Roosevelt Room of the White House. Fettig's was the first military promotion personally performed by Trump.

As director, Fettig has led the Marine Band during live performances on Late Night with David Letterman and National Public Radio. He also launched a project to re-record all of the collected marches of John Philip Sousa, and personally conducted the world premieres of new works by Adam Schoenberg, David Conte, David Rakowski, and Narong Prangcharoen. In 2018, under Fettig's direction, the Marine Band was named as an artist in its first regional Emmy Award, given in the category Special Event Coverage Other than News and Sports, for the WNET-TV broadcast of the television special United States Marine Band "New England Spirit". In 2021, Fettig led the Marine Band in the inauguration of Joe Biden amidst the COVID-19 pandemic.

In his capacity as director of the United States Marine Band, Fettig is also music adviser to the President of the United States.

Civilian awards
Fettig is the 2000 winner of the International Clarinet Association's Young Artist Competition. In 2014 he was elected a member of the American Bandmasters Association, considered the highest honor possible for American bandsmen.

Military awards
 Legion of Merit
 Meritorious Service Medal 
 Navy Commendation Medal
 Navy Unit Commendation
 Navy Meritorious Unit Commendation with two bronze stars
 Marine Corps Good Conduct Medal
 National Defense Service Medal
 Global War on Terrorism Service Medal

References

External links
 Interviews with Jason Fettig on C-SPAN

1970s births
Living people
American bandleaders
American clarinetists
Manchester Central High School alumni
Military personnel from New Hampshire
Musicians from New Hampshire
People from Manchester, New Hampshire
United States Marine Band musicians
United States Marine Corps colonels
University of Massachusetts Amherst alumni
University System of Maryland alumni